
Year 483 (CDLXXXIII) was a common year starting on Saturday (link will display the full calendar) of the Julian calendar. At the time, it was known as the Year of the Consulship of Aginantius without colleague (or, less frequently, year 1236 Ab urbe condita). The denomination 483 for this year has been used since the early medieval period, when the Anno Domini calendar era became the prevalent method in Europe for naming years.

Events 
 By place 
 Byzantine Empire 
 Byzantine general Illus (magister officiorum), and Verina (widow of the late emperor Leo I), attempt to overthrow Emperor Zeno and place another general named Leontius on the throne. 

 Europe 
 The Ostrogoths are given status as foederati; they control a large part of Macedonia and Thrace (Balkans). 

 By topic 
 Religion 
 March 10 – Pope Simplicius dies at Rome after a 15-year reign, and is succeeded by Felix III as the 48th pope. He is a widower with two children.

Births 
 Xiao Baojuan, emperor of Southern Qi (d. 501)
 Xuan Wu Di, emperor of Northern Wei (d. 515)
 Yuan Xun, crown prince of Northern Wei (d. 497)
 Zhu Yi, high official of Southern Liang (d. 549)

Deaths 
 March 10 – Pope Simplicius
 Crimthann mac Énnai, king of Leinster (Ireland)

References